Franko Bogdan (born 22 August 1965) is a Croatian retired football defender and later manager.

Managerial career
He managed HNK Šibenik.

Bogdan founded football club NK Adriatic in 2010.

References

External links
 

1965 births
Living people
Association football defenders
Yugoslav footballers
Croatian footballers
HNK Hajduk Split players
FK Borac Banja Luka players
SpVgg Unterhaching players
Stuttgarter Kickers players
HNK Šibenik players
Yugoslav First League players
2. Bundesliga players
Croatian Football League players
Croatian expatriate footballers
Expatriate footballers in Germany
Croatian expatriate sportspeople in Germany
Croatian football managers
HNK Šibenik managers
Croatian Football League managers